Brian Joseph Bixler (born October 22, 1982) is an American former professional baseball shortstop and outfielder. He has played in Major League Baseball (MLB) for the Pittsburgh Pirates, Washington Nationals and Houston Astros as well as for the United States national baseball team.

College career
Bixler attended college at Eastern Michigan University. Bixler also played in the Great Lakes Summer Collegiate League for the Delaware Cows, as well as for the Brewster Whitecaps of the Cape Cod Baseball League in 2003.

Professional career

Pittsburgh Pirates
Bixler was Pittsburgh's second-round pick in the 2004 Major League Baseball draft. He spent 2004 in the short-season New York–Penn League playing for the Williamsport Crosscutters. He spent his first full professional season with the Class-A Hickory Crawdads. In , Bixler played for both the High-A Lynchburg Hillcats and the Double-A Altoona Curve. In 2007, Bixler played for the Triple-A Indianapolis Indians, and was named the team's most valuable player. On November 20, 2007, the Pirates purchased his contract, protecting Bixler from the Rule 5 draft. That same day, Bixler made his major league debut against the Florida Marlins as a pinch hitter and struck out in his only at bat. He spent the majority of the season in Indianapolis, but made several short appearances for the Pirates. On September 2, he was recalled again when the rosters expanded. He got into 50 games for the Pirates in 2008, with a .423 OPS. In 2009, Bixler attended spring training, but was reassigned to the AAA Indianapolis Indians on March 30. He was recalled to Pittsburgh in late April after Jack Wilson was placed on the disabled list. In 8 games with Pittsburgh, he batted .200. He was optioned back to AAA when Wilson returned from injury. After the June call-ups of AAA outfielders Steven Pearce, Garrett Jones and Jeff Salazar to Pittsburgh, Bixler began to see playing time in center field due to the shortage of players on the roster. Bixler was again recalled to Pittsburgh in mid-August. He got into 18 games for the Pirates in 2009, with a .602 OPS. On January 18, 2010, Bixler was traded to the Cleveland Indians for Jesus Brito.

Cleveland Indians
On January 18, 2010, the Indians acquired Bixler from the Pittsburgh Pirates for Jesus Brito. He was designated for assignment by the Indians on March 17, 2010 to make room on the 40-man roster for Anderson Hernández, and was subsequently sent outright to the minors. While in the Indians' organization, he played 64 games for the AAA Columbus Clippers. On July 11, 2010, he was traded back to Pittsburgh.

Return to the Pirates
On July 11, 2010, the Pirates re-acquired Bixler. He played in 11 games for the AAA Indianapolis. On August 7, 2010 the Pirates sold Bixler to the Washington Nationals.

Washington Nationals

On August 7, 2010 the Pirates sold Bixler to the Washington Nationals. He played in 27 games for the AAA Syracuse Chiefs. Bixler re-signed with the Nationals following the 2010 season and had his contract purchased on April 22, 2011. He got into 79 games with the Nationals in 2011, with a .532 OPS.

Houston Astros
The Houston Astros claimed Bixler off waivers from the Nationals on November 3, 2011. In October 2012, Bixler elected minor league free agency.

New York Mets
On November 16, 2012, the New York Mets announced that Bixler had been signed to a minor league contract with an invitation to Spring training.

Philadelphia Phillies
Bixler signed a minor league deal with the Philadelphia Phillies on February 4, 2014.

San Diego Padres
Bixler signed a minor league deal with the Padres on April 25, 2014. He became a free agent after the 2014 season.

International career
Brian Bixler was named as one of the 24 players that would be part of Team USA in the IBAF 2007 Baseball World Cup. He had a .160 BA with a double and 5 walks in 9 games. The USA won gold in Taiwan.

References

External links

1982 births
Living people
Pittsburgh Pirates players
Washington Nationals players
Houston Astros players
Eastern Michigan Eagles baseball players
Brewster Whitecaps players
Williamsport Crosscutters players
Hickory Crawdads players
Lynchburg Hillcats players
Altoona Curve players
Indianapolis Indians players
Syracuse Chiefs players
Columbus Clippers players
Oklahoma City RedHawks players
Las Vegas 51s players
San Antonio Missions players
El Paso Chihuahuas players
Baseball players from Ohio
Major League Baseball shortstops
Sportspeople from Sandusky, Ohio
Venados de Mazatlán players
American expatriate baseball players in Mexico